WPSL may refer to:

 Weighted planar stochastic lattice, a mathematical structure sharing some of the properties both of lattices and of graphs
 Women's Premier Soccer League
 WPSL (AM), a radio station (1590 AM) licensed to Port St. Lucie, Florida, United States
 National Pro Fastpitch, formerly known as the Women's Pro Softball League